Liam Silke (born 22 November 1994) is an Irish Gaelic footballer who plays at senior level for the Galway county team. He is a nephew of All-Ireland SFC winning Galway captain Ray Silke. Silke plays his club football for Corofin.

Silke is an All-Ireland Senior Club Football Championship winner, having been part of the Corofin team that beat Slaughtneil in the 2015 Final. 

Silke made his senior championship debut for Galway against New York in the 2015 Connacht Senior Football Championship, starting that game. He was part of the team that won the 2016 Connacht Championship, the county's first provincial title since 2008.

Honours
Individual
All Star (1): 2022

References

1994 births
Living people
All Stars Awards winners (football)
Corofin Gaelic footballers
Donegal Boston Gaelic footballers
Gaelic football backs
Galway inter-county Gaelic footballers
Irish expatriate sportspeople in the United States